Sato is a traditional northeastern Thailand (Isan) beer style that has been made for centuries from starchy glutinous or sticky rice by  growers in that region. Just as other regional varieties made not from grapes but cereal are commonly called wine rather than beer, sato is commonly called Thai rice wine.

History
Due to the internal migration of people from Isan throughout Thailand, sato (like many forms of northeastern Thai cuisine) has become increasingly familiar to the general population, as well as expatriates and tourists. This plus the  availability of commercially produced sato have increased its popularity. Under the Thai government's One Tambon One Product program (a government sponsored economic development program abbreviated TP and pronounced OTOP), several districts chose revenue-stamped sato as their OTOP product. Brewers today produce sato under such names as "Siam Sato", "Ruan Rak", "Gru Pli", among others.

() is sato brewed in earthenware jars or jugs (.) It is also called  ( alcohol [of] cradle) —  is alcohol as in lao-Lao ( alcohol [of] Laos),  is "cradle" in the sense of holding something under construction. Some, such as the Phu Thai of Renu, sell home brew sato kits in little brown jugs of various sizes. These also bear revenue stamps and, like the bottled variety, warnings that it is not to be served to those under 18. Typical ingredients include rice chaff, milled rice, and refined sugar, and these make a beer of not more than 6.4 percent alcohol.

Brewing
Sato is brewed with glutinous rice (also called sticky rice); a starter culture, a mixture including primarily sugar; yeast; and water. Traditionally, a starter culture known as luk paeng (a small ball of starch, yeast, and mold) is used to assist in fermentation. The steamed sticky rice is mixed with luk paeng and kept in a fermentation tank for three days, as the starch in the rice changes to sugar.  Water is then added to the fermentation tank and the mixture is allowed to ferment for a further week. Following that, the fresh rice wine is pressed from the dregs, and filtered.

 is prepared by breaking the seal in the mouth of the jar and adding clean water, then immediately drunk.

Owing to the simplicity of the process, the resultant beverage is often of variable quality and has a short shelf life. Some molds and yeasts produce mycotoxins. Ergot, the common name of a fungus in the genus Claviceps that is parasitic on certain grains and grasses, also occurs in tropical regions, and may cause ergotism.

Serving
Sato is typically served at room temperature. In Isan, sato is usually served in a large bowl, into which individuals dip their glasses or cups.  is sold with a pair of bamboo drinking straws, and labels recommend serving to couples.

See also
Rượu cần, in Vietnam
Sra peang, in Cambodia
Lao-Lao

References

Rice wine
Isan
Thai culture
Thai alcoholic drinks